We Could Connect or We Could Not is the debut album from electro glitch band Lismore. This album was recorded in 2003 at Flight in Jersey City, NJ and had its American release in 2004 and its United Kingdom and Canadian releases in 2005.

Track listing
 "Tremolo" – 5:05
 "Pour un Ancien Ami" – 4:43
 "Cut" – 4:29
 "This Time " – 4:05
 "Blood Bank " – 3:27
 "One Room House " – 5:40
 "Finest Hour" – 4:40
 "Come Undone" – 3:54
 "Someday It Will End" – 1:24
 "Aika Miura" – 4:17
 "Tonight" – 5:21
 "Angelize" – 5:49

References

2005 debut albums